Jay Bowerman (born December 17, 1942) is an American biathlete. He competed in the 20 km individual event at the 1972 Winter Olympics.

References

External links
 

1942 births
Living people
American male biathletes
Olympic biathletes of the United States
Biathletes at the 1972 Winter Olympics
Sportspeople from Seattle
Skiers from Seattle